Arezoo M. Ardekani is an Iranian-American physicist who is a professor at Purdue University. Her research considers the flow of complex fluids. She was elected a Fellow of the American Society of Mechanical Engineers in 2020 and a Fellow of the American Physical Society in 2022.

Early life and education 
Ardekani is from Iran. She was born in Isfahan, and was encouraged to become a scientist as a child. She moved to Tehran for her undergraduate studes, where she earned a bachelor's degree at the Sharif University of Technology. Ardekani moved to the University of California, Irvine for graduate research, where she worked on particle interactions. She moved to Massachusetts Institute of Technology as a Shapiro Postdoctoral Fellow, where she worked with Gareth H. McKinley on bead formation in viscoelastic jets.

Research and career 
Ardekani started her independent career at the University of Notre Dame in 2011. She moved to Indiana University–Purdue University Indianapolis in 2014, where she leads the Complex Felow Lab. She investigates complex fluids and particle transport. She combines theoretical analyses with computational simulations to understand fluid flow.

Ardekani studied the microbes that accumulate at oil spills. She identified that microbes initially move due to chemotaxis (they are attracted to the chemical trail of a food source), but subsequently move due to the formation of a hydrodynamic phenomenon. Ardekani demonstrated that microbes are involved with environmental remediation.

Awards and honors 
 2007 Amelia Earhart Fellowship
 2012 National Science Foundation CAREER Award
 2016 Presidential Early Career Award for Scientists and Engineers
 2020 Society of Engineering Science Young Investigator Medal
 2020 Elected Fellow of the American Society of Mechanical Engineers
 2020 Society of Rheology Arthur B. Metzner Early Career Award
 2020 Purdue University University Faculty Scholar
 2022 Elected Fellow of the American Physical Society

Selected publications

References 

Year of birth missing (living people)
Living people
21st-century American physicists
21st-century American women scientists
American women physicists
Scientists from Isfahan
Iranian emigrants to the United States
Sharif University of Technology alumni
University of California, Irvine alumni
Massachusetts Institute of Technology fellows
University of Notre Dame faculty
Indiana University–Purdue University Indianapolis faculty
Fellows of the American Society of Mechanical Engineers
Fellows of the American Physical Society